Bernard McVeigh (15 May 1918 – 23 February 1966) was an Australian rules footballer who played for the Fitzroy Football Club in the Victorian Football League (VFL).

McVeigh also served in the Australian Army during World War II.

Notes

External links 

Bernie McVeigh's playing statistics from The VFA Project

1918 births
1966 deaths
Australian rules footballers from Victoria (Australia)
Fitzroy Football Club players
Yarraville Football Club players